Hsieh Su-wei and Peng Shuai defeated Ekaterina Makarova and Elena Vesnina in the final, 6–4, 7–5 to win the doubles tennis title at the 2013 WTA Tour Championships.

Maria Kirilenko and Nadia Petrova were the reigning champions, but played separately this year. Kirilenko did not qualify; Petrova qualified partnering Katarina Srebotnik, but lost in the semifinals to Hsieh and Peng.

Seeds

Draw

Finals

References
General

Specific

Doubles
WTA Tour Championships
2013 in Turkish tennis